Score is a 1974 erotic romance film directed by Radley Metzger. One of the first films to explore bisexual relationships, it was part of the brief porn chic fad of the Golden Age of Porn in the early 1970s that also included Behind the Green Door, The Devil in Miss Jones and Deep Throat. The film was based on an off-Broadway stage play that ran for 23 performances at the Martinique Theatre from October 28 through November 15, 1971 and featured Sylvester Stallone in a brief role (as telephone repairman Mike). The theatrical version of Score was written by Jerry Douglas, who later became a mainstream screenwriter. It was set in a shabby Queens tenement, while the film was set in an elegant, mythical land and sported a relatively high budget for an independent film of that era.

It has been released in both soft-core and hard-core versions. One DVD release, a soft-core version, shows a renewed copyright date of 1976 (all prints featuring the 1976 copyright are the director's approved, edited version), but the film itself was actually released in the United States in December 1973. Hardcore prints, including full-frontal male nudity and fellatio, run 91 minutes, while the ubiquitous soft-core prints were released in an 84-minute format. First Run Pictures marketed the original hardcore version on videocassette, though it was a limited release available by special mail order only. The restored, uncut and uncensored (hardcore) version was released by Cult Epics on DVD and Blu-ray in 2010.

Plot 
In the mythical European city of Leisure, married couple Jack and Elvira have an ongoing bet regarding who can seduce whom. This comes up in the wake of a swinging night with a couple of tourists picked up via a newspaper ad. Elvira, a self-professed "sexual snob" has bet she can seduce newlywed Betsy, married to handsome marine biologist Eddie. If she fails by midnight, then Jack gets to seduce Eddie.

While Jack and Eddie go to work separately, Betsy comes round to visit her new friend Elvira. She's very intrigued by Elvira's open admission of her swinging lifestyle, including spouse-swapping and drugs. When Mike, the telephone repair man, arrives (Elvira had sabotaged the phone earlier just in hopes of a handsome man showing up), Betsy is fascinated and shocked as Elvira seduces him right before her eyes. She also admits that she's not really happy, especially after catching Eddie masturbating in the bathroom. But she says Elvira's actions are not for her, because at heart she is still a Catholic schoolgirl. Elvira tells a story about Jack, just before they were married, and how he said he would "climb aboard a porcupine" if he had a mind to.

The two couples get together that night, and get slightly high on pot. Pulling out a trunk of costumes, they decide to play dress up. Jack dons a sailor's uniform while Betsy wears a very revealing modeling outfit. To Betsy's shock/tititalation (and Jack's huge amusement), Elvira's costume is based on a nun's wimple, but with nothing underneath. They tease Eddie into putting on a cowboy outfit.

As the night progresses, the two wives and two husbands pair off to wander and chat. During the course of their conversations, each of the naive couple admit to dissatisfaction, including a questioning whether they ever should have gotten married. Eddie, it turns out, was Betsy's brother's best friend. There is a hint that he and Eddie were maybe closer than friends, although Eddie doesn't seem to know that Betsy might realize that. Betsy, meanwhile, lets her hair down and is even a little worried something might "happen" between her and Elvira. She also gets giddy at saying the word "fuck" for the first time. Downstairs, Jack, remarks to Eddie that just before he and Elvira were married, she commented, "Jack, I'd hop in the sack with a porcupine if it struck my fancy."

Elvira and Betsy end up in the upstairs bedroom, with Jack and Eddie in the downstairs den. A quick phone call between the swinging couple has them agree that midnight is the deadline for them both. As the late night progresses, both introduce their perspective seductees to amyl nitrite (each says the same line as they do: "Bingo!") and when asking for the time, interpret the respective watches as either "slow" or "fast" depending upon their own desires.

Both Eddie and Betsy are simultaneously seduced, receiving and giving oral sex. Betsy is even penetrated with a strap-on (while wearing a collar and leash). Eddie, penetrated by Jack, has a brief hallucination that the person making love to him is Betsy.

In the morning, Jack and Elvira consider the score pretty much even. Betsy and Eddie are confused, each thinking perhaps the other is the "normal" one. Betsy even makes a remark about them both being "porcupines." When Mike suddenly arrives for a visit, just as Jack and Elvira are getting ready to have a ménage à trois with Betsy, Jack invites him, too, boasting that they "play all kinds of games around here". A chance remark brings out the fact Mike and Eddie both enjoy bowling. Somewhat to Jack and Elvira's surprise, Mike leaves to play with Eddie and Betsy, who suggests they all get together soon to play "Bingo".

Cast 
 Calvin Culver (aka Casey Donovan) (Eddie, the closeted husband)
 Carl Parker (Mike Nixon, the horny telephone repairman)
 Claire Wilbur (Elvira Jackson, the swinging wife)
 Gerald Grant (Jack Jackson, the swinging husband)
 Lynn Lowry (Betsy, the naive wife)

The woman who plays Jack's assistant was not credited, and there is no information known about her.

Notes
The film Score was released  during the Golden Age of Porn (inaugurated by the 1969 release of Andy Warhol Blue Movie) in the United States, at a time of "porno chic", in which adult erotic films were just beginning to be widely released, publicly discussed by celebrities (like Johnny Carson and Bob Hope) and taken seriously by film critics (like Roger Ebert).

The Yardbirds-style theme song "Where is the Girl" was performed by the house band at the hotel where Metzger and the crew were staying.

According to one film reviewer, Radley Metzger's films, including those made during the Golden Age of Porn (1969–1984), are noted for their "lavish design, witty screenplays, and a penchant for the unusual camera angle". Another reviewer noted that his films were "highly artistic — and often cerebral ... and often featured gorgeous cinematography". Film and audio works by Metzger have been added to the permanent collection of the Museum of Modern Art (MoMA) in New York City.

See also

 Andy Warhol filmography
 Erotic art
 Erotic films in the United States
 Erotic photography
 Golden Age of Porn
 List of American films of 1974
 Sex in film
 Unsimulated sex

References

Further reading
 
 
 Heffernan, Kevin, "A social poetics of pornography", Quarterly Review of Film and Video, Volume 15, Issue 3, December 1994, pp. 77–83. .
 Lehman, Peter, Pornography: film and culture, Rutgers depth of field series, Rutgers University Press, 2006, .
 
 Williams, Linda, Hard core: power, pleasure, and the "frenzy of the visible", University of California Press, 1999, .

External links 
 Score at  MUBI (related to The Criterion Collection)
 .
 Score on the Amazon WebSite.
 Score – review/MondoDigital.
 Score – Trailer (03:38).

American films based on plays
American LGBT-related films
Bisexuality-related films
Bisexual pornographic films
Films directed by Radley Metzger
Films set in Europe
Films shot in Croatia
Gay pornographic films
Lesbian-related films
1974 films
1970s erotic films
1974 LGBT-related films
1970s pornographic films
Swinging (sexual practice)
Yugoslav LGBT-related films
English-language Yugoslav films
1970s English-language films
1970s American films